The 2003–04 Israeli Premier League season was held between 13 September 2003 and 22 May 2004. For the first time, there were two Israeli Arab clubs in the top division; Maccabi Ahi Nazareth and Bnei Sakhnin.

Maccabi Haifa won the title, whilst Nazareth and Maccabi Netanya were relegated. Bnei Sakhnin (who qualified for Europe by winning the State Cup) became the first Arab club to spend more than a single season in the top flight.

Teams and Locations

Twelve teams took part in the 2003-04 Israeli Premier League season, including ten teams from the 2002-03 season, as well as two teams which were promoted from the 2002-03 Liga Leumit.

Maccabi Ahi Nazareth were promoted as champions of the 2002-03 Liga Leumit. Bnei Sakhnin were promoted as runners up. Both Maccabi Ahi Nazareth and Bnei Sakhnin made their debut in the top flight.

Hapoel Kfar Saba and Ironi Rishon LeZion were relegated after finishing in the bottom two places in the 2002-03 season.

 The club played their home games at a neutral venue because their own ground did not meet Premier League requirements.

Final table

Results

First and second round

Third round

Top goal scorers

See also
2003–04 Toto Cup Al

 

Israeli Premier League seasons
Israel
1